, is a Japanese adult film studio, producing and distributing its own films, usually of the bondage, S&M and simulated rape genre, as well as those produced externally.

Company information
The CineMagic company was founded on November 11, 1983, in Tokyo, and they continue to this day in Nakano, Tokyo, with twenty-five employees. In the early 1980s when CineMagic was founded, the VCR had only modest market penetration in Japan and the first AV companies and actresses were just beginning to appear. One of CineMagic's early stars was the "big-bust" actress Eri Kikuchi who made her official AV debut with the video Beautiful D-Cup Girl, Sister L which was released by CineMagic in September 1985.

CineMagic videos are available as online downloads and streaming video from its homepage but DVD versions are distributed through the Hokuto Corporation via its DMM website.

The company belonged to Soft On Demand's Contents Soft Association (CSA) before its closure.

Labels
In addition to videos produced under the CineMagic name, the company also uses the following labels:

 Collect (コレクト) – main label featuring popular actresses
 Eva
 Gang – features orgy and cosplay videos
 kanjuku (完熟)
 Jyou (縄【ジョウ】) –features bondage videos
 Lilies – exclusively lesbian videos
 NOIR (ノワール) - specializes in extreme material, amateurs, bondage & enema
 Vixen (ビクセン)

Actresses
Due to its emphasis on bondage and S&M, actresses specializing in the milder glamour-oriented forms of AV seldom worked for CineMagic but a number of AV Idols have appeared (at least occasionally) in CineMagic videos:

 Kyōko Aizome
 Minami Aoyama
 Rinako Hirasawa
 Bunko Kanazawa
 Mariko Kawana
 Eri Kikuchi
 Hitomi Kobayashi
 Anna Kuramoto
 Aika Miura
 Nozomi Momoi
 Fuka Sakurai
 Riko Tachibana
 Maki Tomoda
 Aki Tomosaki
 Akira Watase
 Sally Yoshino
 Maria Yumeno

Series
A short list of some popular CineMagic series:

 Immoral Angel (インモラル天使)
 Mourning Dress Slave (喪服奴隷)
 Sacrifice of White Robe (白衣の生贄)
 Slave Secretary (奴隷秘書)
 The Big Breast Slave Girl (巨乳隷嬢)
 The Obedient Servant (服従の奉仕メイド)
 The Private Teacher of Disgrace (恥辱の家庭教師)
 Tortured Race Queen (被虐のレースクイーン)

Filmography
 Sortable English filmography at cinemagic.co.jp

References

External links
 
 

Japanese pornographic film studios
Film production companies of Japan
Mass media companies based in Tokyo
Entertainment companies established in 1983
1983 establishments in Japan
Japanese companies established in 1983